C-Stoff ("substance C") was a reductant used in bipropellant rocket fuels (as a fuel itself) developed by Hellmuth Walter Kommanditgesellschaft in Germany during World War II. It was developed for use with T-Stoff (a high-test peroxide) as an oxidizer, which together with C-Stoff as the fuel, forms a hypergolic mixture.

The proportions of the components in C-Stoff were developed to catalyse the decomposition of T-Stoff, promote combustion with the oxygen released by the decomposition, and sustain uniform combustion through sufficient quantity of the highly reactive hydrazine.  The combination of the C-Stoff, used as a rocket fuel, with the T-Stoff used as the oxidizer, often resulted in spontaneous explosion from their combined nature as a hypergolic fuel combination, necessitating strict hygiene in fueling operations; there were numerous catastrophic explosions of the Messerschmitt Me 163 aircraft that employed this fuel system.  Another hazard was toxicity to humans of each of the propellants.

C-fuel 
After the war, Allied studies into rocket propellants continued with engines such as the Armstrong Siddeley Beta, under the name "C-fuel".

See also
UDMH
List of stoffs

References 

Rocket fuels
German inventions of the Nazi period